Fardeqan (also Romanized as Fardeqān and Fardaqān; also known as Fardaghān and Phardogan) is a village in Khenejin Rural District, in the Central District of Komijan County, Markazi Province, Iran. At the 2006 census, its population was 473, in 115 families.

References 

Populated places in Komijan County